This is an incomplete list of professional wrestlers, commentators, managers, road agents, and other workers associated in professional wrestling categorised by the promotion of which the wrestlers are mainly associated:

List

See also
List of professional wrestling promoters
List of professional wrestling promotions
List of independent wrestling promotions in Canada
List of independent wrestling promotions in the United States
List of National Wrestling Alliance territories
List of professional wrestling organisations in Australia
List of professional wrestling promotions in Europe
List of professional wrestling promotions in Japan
List of professional wrestling promotions in Mexico
List of professional wrestling promotions in New Zealand
List of professional wrestling promotions in South America
List of professional wrestling promotions in the United Kingdom
List of women's wrestling promotions
List of women's wrestling promotions in the United States

External links
CAGE MATCH
Wrestlingdata.com
The Internet Wrestling Database

 
Lists of wrestlers